The Shuangliu Airport railway station or Shuangliujichang railway station is located in Shuangliu County on the Chengdu–Guiyang High-Speed Railway, which serves as an airport rail link system for the Chengdu Shuangliu International Airport.

The station is underneath airport Terminal 2 and connects to Terminal 2 of Shuangliu International Airport station on Line 10 of the Chengdu Metro. It takes about 10 minutes from the Chengdu East railway station to the Airport. The station opened on 20 December 2014, along with the railway. Metro Line 10 connects the City Centre and the Airport.

Railway stations in Sichuan
Railway stations in China opened in 2014
Airport railway stations in China